Dzau District (Javis raioni; , Dzawy rajon; , Dzauskij rajon) is a district in South Ossetia.

Geography
Roki Tunnel, Mamison Pass, Transcaucasian Highway, Ossetian Military Road and the lake Ertso are located in the district.

The largest town is Java, the second largest town is Kvaisa located in the western part of the district.

International status
According to administrative division of Georgia, Dzau District is situated in the whole territory of Java Municipality, and part of Oni Municipality and Sachkhere Municipality of Georgia.

Notes

References 

 
Districts of South Ossetia